Tororo Airport  is an airport serving the town of Tororo in the Eastern Region of Uganda.

Location
The coordinates of this airport are 00°40'53.0"N, 34°10'04.0"E (Latitude:0.681389; Longitude:34.167778).

Overview

As of June 2015, the Civil Aviation Authority of Uganda had plans to develop this facility into a regional airport.

See also

 List of airports in Uganda
 Transport in Uganda

References

External links
 Tororo Airport Page At Website of Uganda Civil Aviation Authority
 OurAirports - Tororo
 OpenStreetMap - Tororo
 HERE/Nokia - Tororo

Airports in Uganda
Tororo District
Eastern Region, Uganda